Ge Molin (born December 5, 1938) is a Chinese theoretical physicist and professor at Nankai University. He is a fellow of the Chinese Academy of Sciences.

Education and career

Molin attended Beijing No. 5 High School for his primary education between 1950 and 1956. He obtained a degree from Lanzhou University. He joined Lanzhou University as a faculty member in 1965 and became a professor of physics before he left in 1986 to join Nankai University.

References

1938 births
20th-century Chinese physicists
Members of the Chinese Academy of Sciences
21st-century Chinese physicists
Living people
Lanzhou University alumni
Academic staff of Lanzhou University
Academic staff of Nankai University